Marat Mukhanbetkazyuly Tajin (Marat Mūhanbetqazyūly Täjin; born 8 April 1960) is a Kazakh politician. He served as the Foreign Minister in the Government of Kazakhstan from 2007 to 2009. He previously served as Secretary of the National Security Committee (NSC). In September 2009 he was named an advisor to President Nursultan Nazarbayev and secretary of Kazakhstan's Security Council. Marat Tajin was appointed First Deputy Head of the Executive Office of the President of the Republic of Kazakhstan in January 2017.

Education and early career
He graduated from the Almaty National Economic Institute and continued his post-graduate study at Kazakh State University, eventually becoming a senior lecturer there. From 1987 to 1988 he interned in London, United Kingdom. From 1991 to 1992 he served as a department head at Al-Farabi University in Almaty.

Political career
Tajin began his service as chairman of the NSC in May 2001, succeeding Alnur Musaev. He was replaced shortly thereafter in December 2001 by Nartai Dutbayev.

Tajin replaced Kassym-Jomart Tokayev as foreign minister on 10 January 2007 during a government shake-up. Tokayev became the Chairman of the Senate.

Tajin assisted President Nursultan Nazarbayev in writing several books.

Tajin met with United States Senator Richard Lugar in Astana on 7 February 2006 to discuss biological weapon nonproliferation measures and cooperation with U.S. scientists.

He has received the Order of Kurmet.

January 2013 Marat Tajin was relieved of his duties as Aide to the President and Security Council Secretary and appointed Kazakhstan’s Secretary of State, replacing outgoing Mukhtar Kul-Mukhammed.

February 2014 Marat Tajin was appointed Ambassador Extraordinary and Plenipotentiary of the Republic of Kazakhstan to the Russian Federation.

January 2017 Marat Tajin was appointed First Deputy Head of the Executive Office of the President of the Republic of Kazakhstan.

Perception
Analysts have described him as a theoretician and as a shadow who prefers to wield power behind the scene. President Nazarbayev described him after appointing him foreign minister as a "scholar, a Ph.D., and has been my adviser, including on foreign policy questions. Since the international community attaches great importance to my choice for foreign minister, I appointed the person I know well and believe in. Most importantly, I believe he will succeed in his new job and will bring his own contribution to further foreign policy successes of our country.”

References

Living people
1960 births
Nur Otan politicians
Government ministers of Kazakhstan
Foreign ministers of Kazakhstan
Recipients of the Order of Kurmet
Kazakhstani Muslims
Academic staff of Al-Farabi Kazakh National University
Ambassadors of Kazakhstan to Russia
Directors of intelligence agencies